Edward William Lamb (6 February 1828 – 18 October 1910) was an Australian businessman, banker and politician. In 1867 he was elected to the Legislative Assembly of Queensland for Mitchell and was Queensland's Secretary for Public Lands from 1867 to 1868. A member of the Lamb banking family, he became a director of the Commercial Banking Company of Sydney (now National Australia Bank).

His father Commander John Lamb was a Commercial Banking Company of Sydney director, as were his brothers Walter Lamb, Alfred Lamb and John de Villiers Lamb. His sister-in-law by John de Villiers Lamb, Henrietta Lamb, was the sister of the deputy chairman of the Commercial Banking Company of Sydney, Thomas Smith. His sister-in-law via Walter was Margaret Dangar, daughter of Australian politician and explorer Henry Dangar.

Early life

Lamb was born in London to the banker and politician John Lamb and Emma (née Robinson). His mother Emma Lamb (née Robinson) was the daughter of the deputy chairman of Lloyds Bank. His family migrated to Sydney in 1829, and, after his education, Lamb became a clerk in his father's mercantile firm and later became a partner.

Parliament

Lamb was a member of the Legislative Assembly of Queensland for Mitchell, and Secretary for Public Lands in the administration of Sir Robert Mackenzie, 10th Baronet, from 15 August 1867 to 10 September 1868. In this capacity he passed the Crown Lands Alienation Act.

He was elected to the New South Wales Legislative Assembly as the Labor member for Macquarie in a 1917 by-election caused by the death of Labor MP Thomas Thrower. He was narrowly defeated in 1920 running for the multi-member seat of Murrumbidgee, but in 1921 he was appointed to the New South Wales Legislative Council, in which he served until his retirement in 1955.

Further details

Lamb died in Sydney on 18 October 1910.

References

 

1828 births
1910 deaths
Members of the Queensland Legislative Assembly
English emigrants to Australia
19th-century Australian public servants